Paris–Évreux was a single-day road cycling race held in Île-de-France between 1896 and 2017.

Winners

References

Cycle races in France
1896 establishments in France
Recurring sporting events established in 1896
2017 disestablishments in France
Recurring sporting events disestablished in 2017
Defunct cycling races in France